The Brothers Flub is an animated television series produced by Sunbow Entertainment and co-produced by jigsaw puzzle manufacturer Ravensburger. It aired in the United States on the television network Nickelodeon. The show's title characters are a pair of alien brothers named Guapo and Fraz, both of whom work as couriers, who travel throughout their universe to deliver packages to a different planet in each episode of the series. It ran from January 16, 1999, until January 8, 2000.

Summary
The Brothers Flub takes place in outer space. The show's title refers to its two central characters: a pair of blue-furred alien brothers named Guapo and Fraz Flub. Guapo is shorter and fatter than his brother, and is a lighter shade of blue. Both wear bodysuits, shoes and caps.

In the series, they work for a company called RetroGrade Interdimensional Couriers, of which a green-colored female alien named Tarara Boomdeyay is the boss. Other characters at their job include a female alien named Valerina and an older orange, male alien named Squish. The brothers, who are couriers, travel through their universe in their spacecraft (called the Hoog) to deliver packages to various planets. Each episode features a different planet with a different characteristic, such as "The Land of Oversized Games", which comprises life-sized game pieces such as a pinball machine, or "Hip City", a planet inhabited by beatnik aliens.

History
Cindy Barth of the Orlando Business Journal said that "although still an untested property, optimism is high for the Brothers Flub" because of Sunbow's record and staff members.

Production
The creators marketed the series for children ages six through eleven. Sunbow contracted with Animatics, an Orlando, Florida-based company, allowing for Animatics to create the storyline and the storyboard for the series. Laura Sullivan, the senior director of marketing of Sony Wonder, said in a 1999 Promo article that the series attracted equal numbers of male and female children and that it was "very Nickelodeon-looking." The series was delayed for a year from its original scheduled debut.

Episodes

Cast

Main cast
 Guapo Flub: Jerry Sroka 
 Fraz Flub: Scott Menville
 Tarara Boomdeyay: Charlotte Rae
 Squish: Ron Hale
 Valerina: Christine Cavanaugh

Additional voices
 Richard Horvitz
 Mariette Hartley
 Joe Lala
 John Kassir
 Jerry Sroka
 Tim Curry
 Candi Milo
 Jeff Bennett
 H. Richard Greene
 Michael Bell
 Pat Fraley
 Sally Struthers
 Roger Rose
 Kevin Michael Richardson
 Jennifer Darling
 Bruce Eckstart
 Tom Shell
 Gayiel Von
 Nick Bakay
 Tress MacNeille
 Harvey Korman
 Estelle Harris
 Marsha Clark: Judy Hen
 Stuart Pankin
 Gregg Berger
 Gary Littman
 Vanessa Marshall
 Peter Ratray
 Dee Bradley Baker
 Lori Alan
 Jim Ward
 Billie Hayes
 Michael Horton
 Tom Kenny
 Tommy Widmer: Bob

Crew
 Charlie Adler - Voice Director

Merchandising
The Brothers Flub was used in several promotional deals for various brands. Fast food chain KFC announced that it would use the characters in a kids' meal, while Carl's Jr. and Hardee's branded tray liners and bags with The Brothers Flub images. GNC planned to include The Brothers Flub yo-yos in its children's vitamins, while department store chain Macy's used the characters in their back-to-school advertising flyers. Skechers started a sweepstakes that distributed Skechers and The Brothers Flub-branded items.

VHS release
Sony Wonder released two videocassettes of the show in 1999. These were entitled Plan C: Panic! and Doom Wears Funny Tights!. Each one featured four episodes of the series. Both tapes are now out of print and hard to find.

VHS releases were planned for the series by Maverick in the United Kingdom, but in the end, no releases came to fruition.

Reception
The Brothers Flub was panned by critics. Joanne Weintraub of the Milwaukee Journal-Sentinel described the show as "a rare clinker with all the noisy hyperactivity of Aaahh!!! Real Monsters and little of the cockeyed charm." The Hollywood Reporter called it "a somewhat vacuous effort that lacks the charm and substance of much of Nick's other programming" but added "now and again [the creators] hit on some clever high jinks." Writing for the Lakeland Ledger, Evan Levine thought that the show had a promising premise, but thought that its humor was mean-spirited.

References

External links
 

1990s American animated television series
1990s American comic science fiction television series
1999 American television series debuts
1999 American television series endings
1999 German television series debuts
1999 German television series endings
American children's animated comic science fiction television series
American children's animated space adventure television series
German children's animated science fiction television series
German children's animated space adventure television series
Television series by Sunbow Entertainment
Television series by Sony Pictures Television
Television series set on fictional planets
Animated television series about extraterrestrial life
Animated television series about brothers
Nickelodeon original programming